George S. Dibble (1904 – June 2, 1992) was an American painter, academic and art critic. He was an professor of Art at the University of Utah and an art critic for The Salt Lake Tribune.

Life
Dibble was born in 1904 in Oahu, Hawaii. He was trained at the University of Utah and the Art Students League of New York.

Dibble first taught Art at the Murray High School in Murray, Utah and Washington Elementary School in Salt Lake City. He later became a professor of Art at his alma mater, the University of Utah. He authored a textbook, and he was an art critic for The Salt Lake Tribune for four nearly forty years. Dibble was also a painter in his own right, and he won a prize at the Utah State Fair as early as 1935. He became known as a Cubist watercolorist.

Dibble died of cancer on June 2, 1992 in Salt Lake City, at age 88.

Selected works

Further reading

References

1904 births
1992 deaths
People from Oahu
People from Salt Lake City
American art critics
American male painters
Painters from Utah
American watercolorists
Art Students League of New York alumni
Cubist artists
University of Utah alumni
University of Utah faculty
Deaths from cancer in Utah
20th-century American painters
20th-century American male artists